Orthocomotis parandina is a species of moth of the family Tortricidae. It is found in Napo Province, Ecuador.

The ground colour of the forewings is suffused brownish and ferruginous brown along the dorsum and termen and dotted with rust brown. The hindwings are brown.

Etymology
The species name is derived from Greek para (meaning near) and andina (meaning the Andes).

References

Moths described in 2010
Orthocomotis
Moths of South America
Taxa named by Józef Razowski